Quest Cliffs is a line of steep east-facing cliffs immediately north of The Slot in the Geologists Range. Seen by the northern party of the New Zealand Geological Survey Antarctic Expedition (NZGSAE) (1961–62), they were named after the Quest, the ship of the Shackleton-Rowett Antarctic Expedition, 1921–22.

See also
Mount Ronca

References

Cliffs of Oates Land